Skowarcz  is a village in the administrative district of Gmina Pszczółki, within Gdańsk County, Pomeranian Voivodeship, in northern Poland. It is located within the historic region of Pomerania.

The village has a population of 1,425.

History
During World War II, in 1943–1944, the Germans operated a subcamp of the Stutthof concentration camp in the village. In August 1944, five prisoners managed to escape from the subcamp.

Transport
The Polish National road 91 runs through the village, and the A1 motorway runs nearby, west of the village. There is also a train station in Skowarcz.

References

Villages in Gdańsk County